Newchurch is the name of several places in the United Kingdom:
Newchurch, Blaenau Gwent, Wales
Newchurch, a village in Newchurch and Merthyr, Carmarthenshire, Wales
Newchurch, Herefordshire, England
Newchurch, Isle of Wight, England
Newchurch, Kent, England
Newchurch, Lancashire, England
Newchurch, Monmouthshire, Wales
Newchurch, Powys, Wales
Newchurch, Staffordshire, England
Newchurch in Pendle, Lancashire